Mercy is a non-alcoholic, non-caffeinated beverage marketed as a preventative for hangovers and alcohol flush.

References

Drink brands